Fort Gage is an unincorporated community in Randolph County, Illinois, United States.

References

Unincorporated communities in Randolph County, Illinois
Unincorporated communities in Illinois
Illinois populated places on the Mississippi River